Bolkvadze is a Georgian surname. Notable people with the surname include:

Davit Bolkvadze (born 1980), Georgian footballer
Elisso Bolkvadze (born 1967), Georgian classical pianist
Irakli Bolkvadze (born 1994), Georgian swimmer
Mariam Bolkvadze (born 1998), Georgian tennis player
Rusudan Bolkvadze (born 1959), Georgian actress
 

Surnames of Georgian origin
Georgian-language surnames